A chest radiograph, called a chest X-ray (CXR), or  chest film, is a projection radiograph of the chest used to diagnose conditions affecting the chest, its contents, and nearby structures. Chest radiographs are the most common film taken in medicine.

Like all methods of radiography, chest radiography employs ionizing radiation in the form of X-rays to generate images of the chest. The mean radiation dose to an adult from a chest radiograph is around 0.02 mSv (2 mrem) for a front view (PA, or posteroanterior) and 0.08 mSv (8 mrem) for a side view (LL, or latero-lateral). Together, this corresponds to a background radiation equivalent time of about 10 days.

Medical uses

Conditions commonly identified by chest radiography
 Pneumonia
 Pneumothorax
 Interstitial lung disease
 Heart failure
 Bone fracture
 Hiatal hernia

Chest radiographs are used to diagnose many conditions involving the chest wall, including its bones, and also structures contained within the thoracic cavity including the lungs, heart, and great vessels. Pneumonia and congestive heart failure are very commonly diagnosed by chest radiograph. Chest radiographs are also used to screen for job-related lung disease in industries such as mining where workers are exposed to dust.

For some conditions of the chest, radiography is good for screening but poor for diagnosis. When a condition is suspected based on chest radiography, additional imaging of the chest can be obtained to definitively diagnose the condition or to provide evidence in favor of the diagnosis suggested by initial chest radiography.
Unless a fractured rib is suspected of being displaced, and therefore likely to cause damage to the lungs and other tissue structures, x-ray of the chest is not necessary as it will not alter patient management.

The main regions where a chest X-ray may identify problems may be summarized as ABCDEF by their first letters:
Airways, including hilar adenopathy or enlargement
Breast shadows
Bones, e.g. rib fractures and lytic bone lesions
Cardiac silhouette, detecting cardiac enlargement
Costophrenic angles, including pleural effusions
Diaphragm, e.g. evidence of free air, indicative of perforation of an abdominal viscus
Edges, e.g. apices for fibrosis, pneumothorax, pleural thickening or plaques
Extrathoracic tissues
Fields (lung parenchyma), being evidence of alveolar flooding
Failure, e.g. alveolar air space disease with prominent vascularity with or without pleural effusions

Views

Different views (also known as projections) of the chest can be obtained by changing the relative orientation of the body and the direction of the x-ray beam. The most common views are posteroanterior, anteroposterior, and lateral. In a posteroanterior (PA) view, the x-ray source is positioned so that the x-ray beam enters through the posterior (back) aspect of the chest and exits out of the anterior (front) aspect, where the beam is detected. To obtain this view, the patient stands facing a flat surface behind which is an x-ray detector. A radiation source is positioned behind the patient at a standard distance (most often 6 feet, 1,8m), and the x-ray beam is fired toward the patient.

In anteroposterior (AP) views, the positions of the x-ray source and detector are reversed: the x-ray beam enters through the anterior aspect and exits through the posterior aspect of the chest. AP chest x-rays are harder to read than PA x-rays and are therefore generally reserved for situations where it is difficult for the patient to get an ordinary chest x-ray, such as when the patient is bedridden.  In this situation, mobile X-ray equipment is used to obtain a lying down chest x-ray (known as a "supine film").  As a result, most supine films are also AP.

Lateral views of the chest are obtained in a similar fashion as the posteroanterior views, except in the lateral view, the patient stands with both arms raised and the left side of the chest pressed against a flat surface.

Typical views
Required projections can vary by country and hospital, although an erect posteroanterior (PA) projection is typically the first preference. If this is not possible, then an anteroposterior view will be taken. Further imaging depends on local protocols which is dependent on the hospital protocols, the availability of other imaging modalities and the preference of the image interpreter. In the UK, the standard chest radiography protocol is to take an erect posteroanterior view only and a lateral one only on request by a radiologist. In the US, chest radiography includes a PA and Lateral with the patient standing or sitting up. Special projections include an AP in cases where the image needs to be obtained stat (immediately) and with a portable device, particularly when a patient cannot be safely positioned upright. Lateral decubitus may be used for visualization of air-fluid levels if an upright image cannot be obtained. Anteroposterior (AP) Axial Lordotic projects the clavicles above the lung fields, allowing better visualization of the apices (which is extremely useful when looking for evidence of primary tuberculosis).

Additional views
Decubitus – taken while the patient is lying down, typically on their side. Useful for differentiating pleural effusions from consolidation (e.g. pneumonia) and loculated effusions from free fluid in the pleural space. In effusions, the fluid layers out (by comparison to an up-right view, when it often accumulates in the costophrenic angles).
Lordotic view – used to visualize the apex of the lung, to pick up abnormalities such as a Pancoast tumor.
Expiratory view – helpful for the diagnosis of pneumothorax.
Oblique view – useful for the visualization of the ribs and sternum. Although it's necessary to do the appropriate adaptations to the x-ray dosage to be used.

Landmarks

In the average person, the diaphragm should be intersected by the 5th to 7th anterior ribs at the mid-clavicular line, and 9 to 10 posterior ribs should be viewable on a normal PA inspiratory film. An increase in the number of viewable ribs implies hyperinflation, as can occur, for example, with obstructive lung disease or foreign body aspiration. A decrease implies hypoventilation, as can occur with restrictive lung disease, pleural effusions or atelectasis. Underexpansion can also cause interstitial markings due to parenchymal crowding, which can mimic the appearance of interstitial lung disease. Enlargement of the right descending pulmonary artery can indirectly reflect changes of pulmonary hypertension, with a size greater than 16 mm abnormal in men and 15 mm in women.

Appropriate penetration of the film can be assessed by faint visualization of the thoracic spines and lung markings behind the heart. The right diaphragm is usually higher than the left, with the liver being situated beneath it in the abdomen. The minor fissure can sometimes be seen on the right as a thin horizontal line at the level of the fifth or sixth rib. Splaying of the carina can also suggest a tumor or process in the middle mediastinum or enlargement of the left atrium, with a normal angle of approximately 60 degrees. The right paratracheal stripe is also important to assess, as it can reflect a process in the posterior mediastinum, in particular the spine or paraspinal soft tissues; normally it should measure 3 mm or less. The left paratracheal stripe is more variable and only seen in 25% of normal patients on posteroanterior views.

Localization of lesions or inflammatory and infectious processes can be difficult to discern on chest radiograph, but can be inferenced by silhouetting and the hilum overlay sign with adjacent structures. If either hemidiaphragm is blurred, for example, this suggests the lesion to be from the corresponding lower lobe. If the right heart border is blurred, than the pathology is likely in the right middle lobe, though a cavum deformity can also blur the right heard border due to indentation of the adjacent sternum. If the left heart border is blurred, this implies a process at the lingula.

Abnormalities

Nodule
A lung nodule is a discrete opacity in the lung which may be caused by:
 Neoplasm: benign or malignant
 Granuloma: tuberculosis
 Infection: round pneumonia
 Vascular: infarct, varix, granulomatosis with polyangiitis, rheumatoid arthritis

There are a number of features that are helpful in suggesting the diagnosis:
 rate of growth
 Doubling time of less than one month: sarcoma/infection/infarction/vascular
 Doubling time of six to 18 months: benign tumor/malignant granuloma
 Doubling time of more than 24 months: benign nodule neoplasm
 calcification
 margin
 smooth
 lobulated
 presence of a corona radiata
 shape
 site

If the nodules are multiple, the differential is then smaller:
infection: tuberculosis, fungal infection, septic emboli
neoplasm: e.g., metastases, lymphoma, hamartoma
sarcoidosis
alveolitis
auto-immune disease: e.g., granulomatosis with polyangiitis, rheumatoid arthritis
inhalation (e.g., pneumoconiosis)

Cavities
A cavity is a walled hollow structure within the lungs. Diagnosis is aided by noting:
wall thickness
wall outline
changes in the surrounding lung
The causes include:
cancer
infarct (usually from a pulmonary embolus)
infection: e.g., Staphylococcus aureus, tuberculosis, Gram negative bacteria (especially Klebsiella pneumoniae), anaerobic bacteria, and fungus
Granulomatosis with polyangiitis

Pleural abnormalities
Fluid in space between the lung and the chest wall is termed a pleural effusion. There needs to be at least 75 mL of pleural fluid in order to blunt the costophrenic angle on the lateral chest radiograph and 200 mL of pleural fluid in order to blunt the costophrenic angle on the posteroanterior chest radiograph. On a lateral decubitus, amounts as small as 50ml of fluid are possible. Pleural effusions typically have a meniscus visible on an erect chest radiograph, but loculated effusions (as occur with an empyema) may have a lenticular shape (the fluid making an obtuse angle with the chest wall).

Pleural thickening may cause blunting of the costophrenic angle, but is distinguished from pleural fluid by the fact that it occurs as a linear shadow ascending vertically and clinging to the ribs.

Diffuse shadowing
The differential for diffuse shadowing is very broad and can defeat even the most experienced radiologist. It is seldom possible to reach a diagnosis on the basis of the chest radiograph alone: high-resolution CT of the chest is usually required and sometimes a lung biopsy. The following features should be noted:
type of shadowing (lines, dots or rings)
reticular (crisscrossing lines)
companion shadow (lines paralleling bony landmarks)
nodular (many small dots)
rings or cysts
ground glass 
consolidation (diffuse opacity with air bronchograms)
location (where is the lesion worst?)
upper (e.g., sarcoid, tuberculosis, silicosis/pneumoconiosis, ankylosing spondylitis, Langerhans cell histiocytosis)
lower (e.g., cryptogenic fibrosing alveolitis, connective tissue disease, asbestosis, drug reactions)
central (e.g., pulmonary edema, alveolar proteinosis, lymphoma, Kaposi's sarcoma, PCP)
peripheral (e.g., cryptogenic fibrosing alveolitis, connective tissue disease, chronic eosinophilic pneumonia, bronchiolitis obliterans organizing pneumonia)
lung volume
increased (e.g., Langerhans cell histiocytosis, lymphangioleiomyomatosis, cystic fibrosis, allergic bronchopulmonary aspergillosis)
decreased (e.g., fibrotic lung disease, chronic sarcoidosis, chronic extrinsic allergic alveolitis)

Pleural effusions may occur with cancer, sarcoid, connective tissue diseases and lymphangioleiomyomatosis. The presence of a pleural effusion argues against pneumocystis pneumonia.

Reticular (linear) pattern
(sometimes called "reticulonodular" because of the appearance of nodules at the intersection of the lines, even though there are no true nodules present)
idiopathic pulmonary fibrosis
connective tissue disease
sarcoidosis
radiation fibrosis
asbestosis
lymphangitis carcinomatosa
PCP

Nodular pattern
sarcoidosis
silicosis/pneumoconiosis
extrinsic allergic alveolitis
Langerhans cell histiocytosis
lymphangitis carcinomatosa
miliary tuberculosis
metastases

Cystic
cryptogenic fibrosing alveolitis (late stage "honeycomb lung")
cystic bronchiectasis
Langerhans cell histiocytosis
lymphangioleiomyomatosis

Ground glass
extrinsic allergic alveolitis
desquamative interstitial pneumonia
alveolar proteinosis
infant respiratory distress syndrome (RDS)

Consolidation
pneumonia
alveolar haemorrhage
alveolar cell carcinoma
vasculitis

Signs
The silhouette sign is especially helpful in localizing lung lesions.     (e.g., loss of right heart border in right middle lobe pneumonia),
The air bronchogram sign, where branching     radiolucent columns of air corresponding to bronchi is seen,  usually indicates air-space (alveolar) disease, as from blood, pus, mucus, cells, protein surrounding the air bronchograms. This is seen in Respiratory distress syndrome

Disease mimics
Disease mimics are visual artifacts, normal anatomic structures or harmless variants that may simulate diseases and abnormalities.

Limitations
While chest radiographs are a relatively cheap and safe method of investigating diseases of the chest, there are a number of serious chest conditions that may be associated with a normal chest radiograph and other means of assessment may be necessary to make the diagnosis.  For example, a patient with an acute myocardial infarction may have a completely normal chest radiograph.

Gallery

References

External links

 Chest X-ray Atlas
 USUHS: Basic Chest X-Ray Review
 eMedicine Radiology: Chest articles
 Database of chest radiology related to emergency medicine 
 Introduction to chest radiology: a tutorial for learning to read a chest x-ray
 Chest Radiology Tutorials Free Web Tutorials for Chest Anatomy and Lung Malignancies in Radiology
 Yale: Introduction to Cardiothoracic Imaging

Projectional radiography
Thorax (human anatomy)